Maria Lamb (born January 4, 1986 in St. Paul, Minnesota) is an Olympic speed skater from River Falls, Wisconsin, who competed in the 1,500 meter race and the team pursuit at the 2006 Winter Olympics. She was also selected to compete in the 5000 m for the US at the 2010 and 2014 Winter Olympics.

References

 Maria Lamb profile at USSpeedskating.org
 
 Maria Lamb profile at SpeedSkatingBase.eu
 Maria Lamb profile at NBCOlympics.com

External links
 
 
 

1986 births
American female speed skaters
Speed skaters at the 2006 Winter Olympics
Speed skaters at the 2010 Winter Olympics
Speed skaters at the 2014 Winter Olympics
Olympic speed skaters of the United States
Speed skaters from Saint Paul, Minnesota
People from River Falls, Wisconsin
Sportspeople from Wisconsin
Living people
21st-century American women